Perry Frank Caravello (born November 17, 1963) is an American actor, comedian, and internet personality who is best known as the star of the 2003 movie Windy City Heat and the host of the internet stream Perry Caravello Live.

Early life
Originally from the northwest suburbs of Chicago, Caravello was born in Park Ridge and lived there before moving to Des Plaines, Barrington, Palatine, and Arlington Heights. He moved with his family to Southern California in 1974. In 1979, three weeks after getting his driver's license, he was injured in a car accident that put him in a coma for three weeks. As a result of the accident, Caravello suffered brain trauma.

Career
Caravello started acting and standup comedy around 1988, performing in an aggressive style inspired by his idol Sam Kinison, which earned him the nickname "Scary Perry", and early in his career was trying to get into The Comedy Store when then host Don Barris challenged him to have his chest shaved onstage with a razor and no soap. Caravello did the stunt and was given a regular spot at the comedy club. This was the beginning of frequent comedic collaborations between Caravello and Barris, along with Tony Barbieri (aka "Mole"). All of which were typically at the expense of Perry. Caravello has alleged that in 1992 he was coerced into giving a handjob to a casting director, where in turn, he received fellatio in order to get a role in a movie.

In 2003, Caravello starred in the Comedy Central reality movie Windy City Heat, directed by Bobcat Goldthwait and written by Barris and Barbieri. All three co-starred as well. The movie was one elaborate prank on Perry who was under the impression he had landed his first starring role in a major motion picture. The movie followed him from the beginning being cast in the picture to the conclusion of the "one-night only" premiere where he was awarded a trophy for his outstanding work. Jimmy Kimmel's Jackhole Productions produced the movie.

He had roles in Hot Package, Derek and Simon: The Show, and Virtuosity and was also an extra in Austin Powers in Goldmember where he can be seen multiple times during the prison rap scene.

After Windy City Heat, Caravello started working with Richard Heene on a project called Psyience Detectives in which they played storm chasing detectives. The project ended during production in 2006 when the two men got involved in a physical altercation while filming. After the Balloon boy hoax perpetrated by Richard Heene, Caravello made frequent TV appearances in which he was interviewed in regard to Heene's character. He was then invited on Jimmy Kimmel Live! where he was lampooned for taking advantage of his "15 minutes of fame" in light of the incident.

In 2010, Caravello, Barris and Barbieri started a weekly comedy podcast called The Big 3 Podcast, on Adam Carolla's ACE Broadcasting Network. In 2011 the show moved to Barris' own network, before ending in April 2015. Caravello has spoken on Simply Don The Podcast from 2014 through 2020.

Perry was prank-called by The Jerky Boys on the track "Perry's Slacks" on the 2020 album The Jerky Boys.

Perry Caravello Live
In November 2020, Caravello launched his own live stream on the platform Twitch (and later expanded to YouTube) with the help of his publicist Tom Brennan. The following Perry obtained from Windy City Heat proved to make his streaming channels successful and began streaming 3 to 4 days a week. This also brought him a whole new audience resulting in being Perry's primary source of income after being out of work for many years.

Mousetrap lawsuit
On June 1, 2007, Caravello filed a lawsuit alleging that Jimmy Kimmel, Adam Carolla and Johnny Knoxville promised him ten million dollars if he put his genitals in a mousetrap during an episode of The Adam Carolla Show. The lawsuit was filed after Caravello was injured in the stunt, was not paid, and did not receive accounting of profits and royalties from DVD sales of Windy City Heat.

2020 presidential campaign
In a May 2019 episode of Simply Don The Podcast, Caravello revealed that he would be running for President of the United States in the 2020 U.S. presidential election. Caravello has stated that he would run as an independent on a platform that included abolishing money, building a wall across the Canada–United States border, providing free universal healthcare, and legalizing medical marijuana. He also supports abolishing gay marriage and criminalizing homosexuality, and says he would like to turn San Clemente Island into a gay prison. He announced he had abandoned his run (which he claimed was a joke) on July 18, 2020.

Filmography

References

External links
 Perry Caravello Live
 Real Scary Perry
 The Big 3 Podcast
 

1963 births
Living people
Candidates in the 2020 United States presidential election
20th-century American comedians
21st-century American comedians
American male television actors
American podcasters
American stand-up comedians
People with traumatic brain injuries
Place of birth missing (living people)
Twitch (service) streamers
American YouTubers
English-language YouTube channels
Prank calling
People from Los Angeles
People from Chicago